Gunnborga (fl. 11th century), also known as Gunnborga den goda (literary: 'Gunnborga the Good'), was a Viking Age Swedish runemaster.

She was responsible for the Hälsingland Rune Inscription 21, and has been referred to as the only confirmed female runemaster.

See also
 Frögärd i Ösby

Notes

11th-century Swedish people
Runemasters
11th-century Swedish women
Medieval women artists
11th-century artists